Roberta Alexander (born March 3, 1949) is an American operatic soprano. She began her career as a lyric soprano in 1975 and spent the next three decades performing principal roles with opera houses internationally. Particularly celebrated for her performances of Mozart heroines, she was a leading soprano at the Metropolitan Opera from 1983 to 1991. In addition to principal Mozart roles like Countess Almaviva, Elettra, Fiordiligi, and Donna Elvira, she had particular success with the parts of Mimì in Puccini's  La bohème and the title role in Janáček's Jenůfa. More recently she has performed secondary character roles on stage, including performances at the Grand Théâtre de Provence in 2013, La Scala in 2014, and La Monnaie in 2015. She performed the Fifth Maid in Strauss's Elektra at the Met in 2016 and Curra in Verdi's La forza del destino at the Royal Opera House, Covent Garden, in 2019.

Life and career
Born in Lynchburg, Virginia, Alexander's parents both studied music at Virginia State College where they were pupils of Undine Smith Moore. Her mother was a soprano, and her father was a choral conductor. She grew up in Yellow Springs, Ohio, after her family moved there when she was age two. Her father directed choirs as Wilberforce University. She studied music at Central State University, the University of Michigan at Ann Arbor, and the Royal Conservatory of The Hague (with Herman Woltman).

Alexander moved to the Netherlands at age 23. She made her debut at the Netherlands Opera in 1975 as Fanny in La cambiale di matrimonio. Later that year she created the role of Bubikopf in the world premiere of Viktor Ullmann's Der Kaiser von Atlantis. Other early roles with that house included  Princess Ninetta in Prokofiev's The Love for Three Oranges, the Second Woodnymph in Rusalka, and the fifth maid in Strauss's Elektra. She made several guest appearances as Mozart heroines with the Berlin State Opera and the Zürich Opera, including the roles of Fiordiligi in Così fan tutte, Elettra in Idomeneo, and Countess Almaviva in The Marriage of Figaro.

In 1980 Alexander made her American debut as Pamina in The Magic Flute with the Houston Grand Opera. That same year she made her debut at the San Francisco Opera as the Witch/Anne Sexton in Conrad Susa's Transformations. She was an apprentice singer with Santa Fe Opera, and made her feature role debut with Santa Fe Opera under conductor John Crosby in the title role of Strauss's Daphne in 1981. Her Metropolitan Opera debut was in 1983 as Zerlina in Don Giovanni. She later returned to the Met as Bess in Porgy and Bess (1985), the title role in Jenůfa (1985, 1986), Vitellia in La clemenza di Tito (1987, 1991), Mimì in La bohème (1987), Antonia in The Tales of Hoffmann (1987), Countess Almaviva (1988, 1989), Donna Elvira in Don Giovanni (1990),  and the Fifth Maid in Elektra (2016)

In 1982 Alexander made her debut at the Komische Oper Berlin as Puccini's Mimì, a role she sang again for her debuts at The Royal Opera, London in 1984 and the English National Opera in 1992. In 1985 she gave her first of several performances at the Theater an der Wien as Cleopatra in Handel's Giulio Cesare, and sang Donna Elvira for her debut at the Vienna State Opera in 1986. In 1989 she gave a lauded portrayal of the title role in Jenůfa at the Glyndebourne Festival, and returned there as Vitellia in 1995. She performed and recorded several works with Nikolaus Harnoncourt and the Concentus Musicus Wien, including the title role in Handel Theodora in 1990 and the role of Daphne in Handel's Apollo e Dafne in 1992. In 1994 she portrayed the title role in Berthold Goldschmidt's Beatrice Cenci at the Opernfest in Berlin. In 1997 she portrayed Donna Elvira at the Florida Grand Opera. In 2004 she portrayed Hannah Pitt and other characters in the world premiere of Péter Eötvös's Angels in America at the Théâtre du Châtelet in Paris.

Alexander has recorded for the Dutch label Etcetera Records, in addition to selected recordings for such labels as Philips. Orchestras she has performed with include the Vienna, London and Royal Philharmonics; Royal Concertgebouw, Philadelphia, Cleveland and Bavarian Radio Orchestras; and the Cincinnati, Atlanta, Boston, and Dallas Symphony Orchestras. Conductors she has worked with include Vladimir Ashkenazy, Andrew Litton, Bernard Haitink, Sir Colin Davis, Nikolaus Harnoncourt, James Levine, Zubin Mehta, Carlo Maria Giulini, Leonard Slatkin, Jesus Lopez-Cobos, Seiji Ozawa, André Previn, Sir Simon Rattle, and David Zinman.

Alexander has been married twice. Her first marriage was to Edo de Waart in the early 1970s, and ended in divorce. She married her second husband, orchestral manager Siebe Riedstra, in 1975.

Selected discography
 Johann Sebastian Bach: St John Passion, with the Staatskapelle Dresden conducted Peter Schreier on (Philips)
 Johann Sebastian Bach: Mass in B minor, with the Bavarian Radio Symphony Orchestra conducted by Carlo Maria Giulini on (Sony Classical)
 Ludwig van Beethoven: Symphony no. 9, Royal Philharmonic  conducted by André Previn (RCA)
 Willem de Fesch: Oratorio Joseph, with Claron McFadden and Musica ad Rhenum conducted by Jed Wentz (NM Classics/Brilliant Classics)
 George Gershwin: Porgy and Bess, (selections), with the New York Philharmonic conducted by Zubin Mehta (Teldec 46318); 
 George Gershwin: Porgy and Bess, conducted by Leonard Slatkin, (Philips); 
 Christoph Willibald Gluck: Paride ed Elena, conducted by Michael Schneider (conductor)
 Berthold Goldschmidt: Beatrice Cenci;  conducted by Lothar Zagrosek (Sony Classical)
 George Frideric Handel: Theodora – Roberta Alexander, Jochen Kowalski, Hans Peter Blochwitz, Concentus Musicus Wien,  conducted by Nikolaus Harnoncourt (Teldec)
 Handel: Samson – Anthony Rolfe Johnson, Roberta Alexander, Jochen Kowalski, Christoph Pregardien, Alastair Miles, Maria Venuti, Arnold Schoenberg Chor, Concentus Musicus Wien,  conducted by Nikolaus Harnoncourt (Teldec)
 Janáček: Jenůfa,  conducted by Andrew Davis (Glyndebourne DVD)
 Gustav Mahler: Symphony No. 4; Concertgebouw Orchestra, Amsterdam;  conducted by Bernard Haitink (Philips 412 119–2)
 Wolfgang Amadeus Mozart: Don Giovanni,  conducted by Nikolaus Harnoncourt (Teldec)
 Antonio Salieri: Prima La Musica, Poi Le Parole,  conducted by Nikolaus Harnoncourt (Teldec)
 Georg Philipp Telemann: Ino,  conducted by Nikolaus Harnoncourt (Teldec 44633)

Recitals
 Hendrik Andriessen: Miroir de Peine, Magna res est amor, Fiat Domine – with the Netherlands Radio Chamber Orchestra led by David Porcelijn (NM Classics, 1992 – winner of the Edison Award )
 Roberta Alexander sings Samuel Barber – arias from Vanessa and Antony and Cleopatra, plus Andromache's Farewell, Knoxville: Summer of 1915, Songs with orchestra, Edo de Waart (conductor)
 Roberta Alexander – Broadway Songs, David Triestram
 Roberta Alexander – Songs my Mother taught me,  Brain Masuda
 Leonard Bernstein: Songs, Roberta Alexander, Tan Crone
 Mario Castelnuovo-Tedesco: The Divan of Moses-Ibn-Ezra, Op. 207, Roberta Alexander, Dick Hoogeveen
 Giacomo Puccini: Songs, Roberta Alexander, Tan Crone, Raphael String Quartet
 Richard Strauss: Lieder, Roberta Alexander, Tan Crone
 Wolfgang Amadeus Mozart: Lieder, Roberta Alexander, Glen Wilson
 Charles Ives: Songs Volumes 1 and 2, Roberta Alexander, Tan Crone
 Aaron Copland: Songs, Roberta Alexander, Roger Vignoles
 Samuel Barber: Songs, Roberta Alexander, Tan Crone
 Heitor Villa-Lobos: Songs Volumes 1 and 2, Roberta Alexander, Alfred Heller, Diane Chaplin

References

External links
 
 , Alexander with Jerry Hadley and Thomas Hampson, 1998 Concertgebouw

1949 births
Living people
20th-century African-American women singers
20th-century American women opera singers
African-American women opera singers
21st-century African-American women singers
21st-century American women opera singers
American expatriates in the Netherlands
American operatic sopranos
Central State University alumni
Musicians from Lynchburg, Virginia
People from Yellow Springs, Ohio
Royal Conservatory of The Hague alumni
Singers from Ohio
Singers from Virginia
University of Michigan alumni